Radio 2 may refer to:

 ABC Radio 2, former name of ABC's Radio National, Australia (1947–1985)
 BBC Radio 2, a British national music radio station
 CBC Radio 2, a Canadian national music radio network
 CyBC Radio 2, Cyprus national radio
 NPO Radio 2, a Dutch radio station
 Radio 2 (Australian radio station), a defunct narrowband Australian radio network (2001–2006)
 Radio 2 (Belgium), a Belgian radio station
 Radio 2 (Ghana), a national radio station in Ghana
 Radio 2 (Estonia) (Raadio 2), an Estonian radio station
 Rai Radio 2, an Italian radio station
 RTÉ 2fm, an Irish music radio station originally known as Radio 2